Aghuz Darreh (also Romanized as Āghūz Darreh and Āghūzdarreh; also known as Āghūzdar and Āghūz Dar) is a village in Tuskacheshmeh Rural District, in the Central District of Galugah County, Mazandaran Province, Iran. At the 2006 census, its population was 397, in 96 families.

References 

Populated places in Galugah County